Almer is a village in Dorset, England. Almer is located on the A31 road near Winterborne Zelston, Huish Manor, Sturminster Marshall and opposite the Drax estate. The main features of the village are Almer Manor, Almer Parish church and the old school house. The school was co-educational; it opened in 1925 and closed in 1964. The Almer School Honours tablet is now kept in Winterborne Zelston village hall.  The seven residential properties in Almer are owned and let by the Charborough (Drax) Estate.

Almer Parish Church is dedicated to St Mary and is Grade 1 Listed.

References

External links

Villages in Dorset